Emmett Littleton Ashford (November 23, 1914 – March 1, 1980), nicknamed Ash, was the first African American umpire in Major League Baseball, working in the American League from 1966 to 1970.

Early life
Ashford was born in Los Angeles, California. His father, Littleton, was a policeman, but abandoned the family, leaving Ashford's mother Adele to raise Emmett and his brother Wilbur. Ashford earned money selling Liberty magazine, and as a cashier in a supermarket. Ashford attended Jefferson High School, and was co-editor of the school paper, played baseball and track, and was the senior class president.

Ashford attended Los Angeles Junior College. He graduated from Chapman University in 1941.

In about 1936, Ashford took a job as a post office clerk, a position he held for 15 years. In the late 1930s, Ashford briefly attempted to play semipro baseball, but turned to umpiring when he was asked to fill in for an umpire who did not show up to a game.

Ashford served in the Navy during World War II, and was inspired to become the first black major league umpire while stationed in Corpus Christi, Texas, when an announcement came on the radio that Jackie Robinson had broken baseball's color barrier.

Early career
In 1951, Ashford took a leave of absence from his Santa Ana, California post office job, where he moonlighted as a Santa Ana municipal league softball and National Night Ball League of Southern California umpire. His colorful style included a personal trademark: when a batter received a base-on-balls, instead of simply calling "Ball Four," Ashford would grandly intone, "Ball Fo-uh, you may proceed to first base."  He left Santa Ana to umpire in the Southwestern International League, becoming the first black umpire in the traditionally white professional baseball system. When he was offered a full-season umpiring job, Ashford resigned from the postal service.

After the Southwestern International League folded mid-season, Ashford joined the Arizona–Texas League. He moved on to the Western International League in 1953, and was promoted to the Pacific Coast League in 1954. He worked with Cece Carlucci as his crew chief for 922 games.

Ashford spent 12 years in the PCL, and became known for his exuberance, showmanship and energy, even interacting with the crowd between innings. During the off-seasons, Ashford refereed Pac-8 basketball games and college football. He also umpired in the Caribbean winter leagues, and ran several umpiring clinics. In 1963, Ashford was named the PCL's umpire-in-chief, making him responsible for training crews and advising the league on disputed games or rules.

Major league career
By the early 1960s, many West Coast sportswriters began to suggest that Ashford be promoted to the major leagues. In September 1965, Ashford's contract was sold to the American League. Ashford made his debut at D.C. Stadium on April 11, 1966. He quickly became a sensation, becoming known for sprinting around the infield after foul balls or plays on the bases. Ashford also brought a new style to being an umpire. He wore jewelry, including flashy cuff links, and wore polished shoes and freshly-pressed suits. While some observers believed that his race prevented him from working in the majors earlier than he did, others maintained that his flashy style actually delayed his major league debut due to general disdain for umpires to draw attention to themselves. The Sporting News stated that "For the first time in the history of the grand old American game, baseball fans may buy a ticket to watch an umpire perform."

Ashford was the left field umpire in the 1967 All-Star Game, and worked all five games of the 1970 World Series, but did not work home plate.

Ashford was one of the only umpires fiery Baltimore Orioles manager Earl Weaver was ever nice to during a game. During a doubleheader against Washington on April 13, 1969, Ashford ruled that a ball hit by Ken McMullen had landed fair in left field, when in actuality Don Buford had caught it just before it hit the ground. Weaver went up to Ashford and politely asked him, "Can you change your call? Just ask the other umpires, because I understand you couldn't see it where you were running from." The other umpires all said Buford had made the catch, so Ashford reversed the call.

Ashford reached the American League's retirement age of 55 in December 1969, but still umpired one additional season in 1970 before retiring.

After umpiring
In 1971, Ashford was hired by Bowie Kuhn as a public relations adviser, a role in which Ashford spoke and held clinics on the west coast, and as far away as Korea. He also served as umpire-in-chief for the Alaskan summer league for three years. He appeared in television commercials, playing a cashier in an ad for A&P Grocery stores. Ashford also appeared as an umpire in the 1976 film The Bingo Long Traveling All-Stars & Motor Kings, and in episodes of Ironside, The Jacksons, and What's My Line?, in which Ashford appeared in his first major league season. Ashford was also a contestant on November 17, 1955, TV edition of You Bet Your Life.

Ashford was inducted into the Baseball Reliquary's Shrine of the Eternals in 2008.

Ashford died of a heart attack at age 65 in Marina del Rey, California. Upon his death, Bowie Kuhn issued a statement, saying, "As the first black umpire in the major leagues, his magnanimous nature was sternly tested, but he was unshaken and uncomplaining, remaining the colorful, lively personality he was all his life." At his funeral, Ashford was eulogized by Kuhn and former USC baseball coach Rod Dedeaux. Ashford was cremated, and his ashes were interred in Cooperstown, New York.

Further reading

See also

List of Major League Baseball umpires

References

External links
Retrosheet
SABR biography
Ashford's appearance on You Bet Your Life, 1955
Emmett Ashford Oral History Interview - National Baseball Hall of Fame Digital Collection

1914 births
1980 deaths
African-American sports officials
Chapman Panthers baseball players
Chapman University alumni
Los Angeles City College alumni
Major League Baseball umpires
Sportspeople from Los Angeles
The Great Atlantic & Pacific Tea Company
Baseball people from California
Jefferson High School (Los Angeles) alumni
20th-century African-American sportspeople
Baseball players from Los Angeles